Kunino Point (‘Nos Kunino’ \'nos ku-ni-'no\) is a rocky point on Blagoevgrad Peninsula, Oscar II Coast, Graham Land in Antarctica, the south extremity of an eponymous ridge extending 2.4 by 2 km on the north coast of Exasperation Inlet.  Formed in 2002 as a result of the disintegration of Larsen Ice Shelf in the area.

The feature is named after the settlement of Kunino in northwestern Bulgaria.

Location

Maps
 Antarctic Digital Database (ADD). Scale 1:250000 topographic map of Antarctica. Scientific Committee on Antarctic Research (SCAR), 1993–2016.

References
 Kunino Point. SCAR Composite Antarctic Gazetteer.
 Bulgarian Antarctic Gazetteer. Antarctic Place-names Commission. (details in Bulgarian, basic data in English)

External links
 Kunino Point. Copernix satellite image

Headlands of Graham Land
Oscar II Coast
Bulgaria and the Antarctic